Buglass is a Scottish surname. Buglass derives from the old lands of Booklawes near Melrose, Roxburghshire. An earlier form of spelling is Buke-Lawes, i.e. buck or stag and low ground. Other theories include that the name originates from family/clan colour identification, specifically the Gaelic words Buidhe and Glas (yellow and green respectively) or it is of Norman descent.

The first recorded instance of the name is from 1220, when a Robert de Bucles witnessed a confirmation charter in favour of the Abbey of Kelso. In 1423, John Bewclase (described as “a trustworthy man”) witnessed the testament of Alexander Hume of Dunglass. The name is affiliated with the Home or Hume clan (see below).

Other early recordings of the name, in various spellings, were:

John Bukles, who witnessed an instrument of sasine in Lothian in 1535. Kathrine Bukles is recorded in 1589, whilst Agnes Buckles was noted to be living in the parish of Livingstone in 1675, and a John Bowglase signed a document in 1684 in Overlaskeoch.

There are further variants of the name in the sixteenth century in Lothian:

Buccles (1539);
Bukeles (1571);
Buikles (1584 and 1603); and  Bugloss (1680)

The Home clan, to which Buglass is affiliated, derives from Patrick, Earl of Dunbar, who lived early in the 13th century.

Alexander Home was created a Baron in 1473, and the title was raised to an Earldom by James VI in 1605. Eventually, the family of Home of Coldingknow succeeded to the title, and from this, the 14th Earl is directly descended. For political reasons, he resigned his earldom to become Sir Alec Douglas-Home, later Prime Minister of the United Kingdom. In 1729, a Stephen Buglas [sic] was appointed vice tidesman at the port of Dumfries.

Due to the geographical position of Roxburghshire, the Buglass name is also common in northern parts of England, such as Northumberland.

Notable people with the surname
Rita Buglass Gluck

References

Scottish surnames